Malé náměstí is a square in Old Town, Prague, in the Czech Republic.

External links

 

Old Town (Prague)
Squares in Prague